Australia competed at the 2012 Winter Youth Olympics in Innsbruck. The chef de mission of the team was former Olympic champion Alisa Camplin, the first time a woman is the chef de mission of any Australian Olympic team. The Australian team consisted of 13 athletes in 8 sports.

Medalists

Alpine skiing

Australia has qualified one boy and one girl.

Boys

Girls

Biathlon

Australia has qualified one boy.

Boys

Cross country skiing

Australia has qualified one boy and one girl.

Boys

Girls

Sprint

Figure skating

Australia has qualified one girl.

Freestyle skiing

Australia has qualified one boy and one girl for the ski cross events. Australia has qualified an athlete in the boys' halfpipe event.

Halfpipe

Ski cross

Ice hockey

Australia has qualified a boy and girl athlete for the skills challenge competition.

Luge

Australia has qualified one boy.

Singles

Snowboarding

Australia has qualified one girl.

See also
Australia at the 2012 Summer Olympics

References

Winter Youth Olympics
Nations at the 2012 Winter Youth Olympics
Australia at the Youth Olympics